Granville (Norman: Graunville) is a commune in the Manche department and region of Normandy, northwestern France. It is sometimes nicknamed "Monaco of the North" by virtue of its location on a rocky promontory.

The town was founded by a vassal of William the Conqueror on land occupied by the Vikings in the 11th century. The old privateer city and fortification for the defence of Mont Saint-Michel became a seaside resort in the 19th century which was frequented by many artists and equipped with a golf course and a horse racing course.

Administratively, the islands of Chausey, the French Channel Islands, which include a small harbour, are part of the commune of Granville.

The town is populated by 13,021 inhabitants, who are called Granvillais.

Geography

Location
The upper town is located on a peninsula surrounded by schist cliffs, known as Pointe du Roc or Cap Lihou.

The commune has four sand beaches, one to the north between the peninsula and the river, three to the south on the bay.

This situation also sometimes leads to significant changes of the coastal features of the nearby beaches.

Off the coast, the archipelago of the Chausey Islands is administered by the commune of Granville. It is one of the only island quarters of France. It consists of 52 islands of granite at high tide and more than 365 at low tide covering almost .

Hydrography
Granville has natural limits materialised by the  river to the north and the Saigue stream in the south. For a few years, an artificial river pierced between the mainland and the peninsula. It was filled and is now replaced by Place du Maréchal-Foch.

Relief
The commune is largely at sea level. It rises only towards the interior, a little more on the peninsula from the Pointe du Roc to reach .

Neighbouring communes
Granville, located on the Pointe du Roc is washed to the north, south and to the west by the English Channel. To the northeast lies the commune of Donville-les-Bains, the village of Yquelon is to the east and to the southeast are the small seaside resort of Saint-Pair-sur-Mer and the village of Saint-Planchers. The island quarter of Chausey is located off to the northwest, and Mont Saint-Michel is to the south.

Climate
Granville is located on the English Channel coast, it is therefore subject to an oceanic climate. However its positioning on the Bay of the Mont Saint-Michel, at the bottom of the gulf formed by Normandy and Brittany, allows it to be relatively protected from storms and wind (even though it may be exposed to the ) and enjoy mild temperatures. The insolation values given here are those of the station of Caen, due to the lack of local data. Contrary to a common misconception,  of total precipitation shows that Normandy is not a wetter region than others.

Transport

It is also crossed from north to south by the old , today the RD 911, the road to the coast at Avranches.

The  departing from Paris-Montparnasse railway station has its terminus at Granville station; it is used by TER Normandie long and medium distance services.

Several bus routes connect Granville with a network set up by the General Council of Manche,  with routes 2, 3, 7, 116, 122, 202, 300, 302 and 305, and the Néva network since December 2014, created and operated in-house by the town of Granville.

The  allows landings of private aircraft and the Caen – Carpiquet Airport ensures the interregional links.

By sea, the port of Granville serves the Chausey Islands and the Channel Islands (44,100 passengers) and hosts freight activities (197,000 tonnes).

An urban transport network is planned for 2014 and should cross the whole .

Quarters and localities
The commune is divided into several quarters: the Haute Ville, the historic heart behind the ramparts; Couraye; La Tranchée, which occupies the former site of an arm of the sea dug by man; Le Calvaire; Le Centre, the current town centre; and Saint-Nicolas, which corresponds to the former commune of Saint-Nicolas-près-Granville, joined in 1962. The quarter of the Agora has been classified priority in the title under the policy of the commune.

Toponymy

The name of the city is mentioned in the forms of Grandivilla in 1054, Grande Villa in 1056, Grandvilla in 1172 and Granville in 1175.

All modern toponymists agree on the origin of the Gran- element: Albert Dauzat and Charles Rostaing have classed Granville with the toponyms of the Grandvelle/Grandville type, whose first term is explained just by the Old French grant ("grand").

According to Édouard Le Héricher ("Avranchin monumental and historic") the origin of the toponym is explained by a character named Grant who received the fief of Rollo of Normandy during the conquest of Neustria.

If experts agree all that it is a medieval formation of -ville, the exact meaning to give this suffix varies between "village, hamlet" (Albert Dauzat and Charles Rostaing, François de Beaurepaire, Ernest Nègre) and "domain" (René Lepelley) which should probably be in the sense of "rural area", initially it had the value of the Gallo-Roman VILLA.

Some historians and geographers of the past have attempted to connect Granville to the Grannonum/Grannona, toponym attested in the Notitia Dignitatum on the Saxon Shore from the late Roman Empire: tribunus cohortis primae Armoricanae, Grannona novae in litore Saxonico. This explains why some 18th-century maps describing the former Roman Gaul revealed the name of Grannonum at the location of Granville (see map opposite). This hypothesis is now abandoned by contemporary practitioners.

During the Revolution, the town temporarily took the name of Granville-la-Victoire (after the siege of the Vendéens she had victoriously endured in 1793), the name was then formalised without this complementary addition.

According to the standard Norman spelling developed in the second half of the 20th century, the name of the town is written as Graunville.

Cap Lihou is named from the Old Norse word holm meaning "island, islet" and which has in some cases evolved as -hou, as the endpoint.

History

Origins

Granville, in the heart of the land, would then become like Dinard and Saint-Malo a coastal town known as Roque de Lihou.

In 1066, William the Conqueror in his conquest of England, sought the help of the Grant family. As a token of recognition, he awarded the lands of Roque de Lihou. The Grants are therefore the first Lords of the town after the Vikings. In 1143, the parish of Notre-Dame was created. It is probable that monks from Mont-Saint-Michel went to the Priory on Lihou during the first half of the 12th century. In 1252, in the absence of a male descendant, Jeanne de Granville married Raoul d'Argouges, Lord of Gratot. In 1424, the criminal case of Pierre Le Maçon took place in Granville, which was then judged by the chancery of Henry VI of England in February 1425, in Paris. In 1439, the construction of the  began.

On 26 October 1439, Sir Thomas de Scales, Seneschal of Normandy, and English officer of the Hundred Years' War, bought the Roque of Jean d'Argouges. On order of King Henry VI of England, in order to isolate Mont Saint-Michel, the last French bridgehead into Norman territory, he had the walls of Granville built. In 1440, the construction of the fortress began. To further protect this city, Lord Thomas de Scales had a ditch dug between the peninsula and the mainland, so that the sea and the waters of the Boscq made the peninsula an island.

However, on 8 November 1442, by ruse,  took over the castle since which has remained permanently in the hands of the French. Charles VII decided to make Granville a fortified town and signed a charter in 1445 granting arms and exempting the residents of tax. From 1450, ships were fishing at Newfoundland. In 1470, Louis XI visited the town to ensure its loyalty in the conflict opposing the Bretons and Burgundians. In 1492, the Jews of Spain, expelled by the Alhambra Decree, arrived in France. A community settled in Granville, their right to trade and to lend money allowed the town to arm a large fleet.

Early modern era

In 1562, the restoration of the ramparts began and a garrison moved into the barracks. Then in 1593 the keys to the city were presented to Henry IV, marking the importance of the town to the Kingdom. Under Louis XIII, the fortifications were adapted for artillery. From the reign of Louis XIV, Granville ships also had the right to capture. Therefore, between seventy and eighty ships were armed and Granville gave fifteen admirals to France, of which the best known is Georges René Le Peley de Pléville. In 1688, Louvois razed part of the defences of the town. Louis XIV appointed the first mayor of Granville in 1692: Luc Leboucher de Gastagny. However, in 1695, during the Nine Years' War, the English bombarded the city, destroying 27 houses. Vauban then studied possible improvements to the stronghold without having the time to carry them out.

Following the attack, the ramparts were raised and increased in 1720. Then, from 1749, development work and expansion of the port was undertaken, with, in 1750, the laying of the breakwater, ever-present today. This work was completed in 1757, in the meantime, a new barracks was built. In 1763, a fire swept through the faubourgs. In 1777, a new barracks was added, the Gênes barracks still present today. On 20 July 1786, a new fire broke out, this time in the Tranchée quarter at the gates of the citadel.

On 14 November 1793, or 24 brumaire year II, was the Siege of Granville by the Vendéens during the Virée de Galerne. A force of some 25,000 Vendéen troops (followed by thousands of civilians of all ages), commanded by Henri de la Rochejaquelein, headed for the port of Granville where they expected to be greeted by a British fleet and an army of exiled French nobles. Arriving at Granville, they found the walled city surrounded by Republican forces, with no British ships in sight. Their attempts to take the city were unsuccessful. During the retreat the extended columns fell prey to Republican forces. Repulsed by the population, having lost two thousand men, they had to abandon the assault but left by burning the Rue des Juifs. On 14 September 1803, the English again bombarded the town after imposing a blockade of the coast.

From 1815, after years of military conflict, in full Restoration, Granville seemed to take a new direction. The chamber of commerce and industry was created; in 1816, the shores of the Boscq baptised Cours Jonville; in 1823, the breakwater was joined to the land, and in 1827, the first stone of the Roc Lighthouse was laid.

Granville once formed part of the diocese of Coutances, the Parliament of Rouen and the intendance of Caen. Before the French Revolution, the town had two parishes: The Church of Notre-Dame du Cap Lihou and Saint-Nicolas.  This parish was an appendix of Notre-Dame until Saint-Nicolas was set up in 1829 whose territory is regarded as a commune independent of Granville.

The port obtained its current appearance after 1856 and the inauguration of the wet dock and the lock. In 1860, the first wooden casino, built by former Mayor Méquin, was inaugurated. In 1865, it was followed by the hospice of St. Peter. In 1866, Victor Chesnais composed a hymn for his town, "La Granvillaise", adapted in 1868 at the theatre.

In 1867, the town acquired its first oared lifeboat, the Saint-Thomas-et-Saint-Joseph-de-Saint-Faron. The town really became a seaside resort welcoming Parisians and guests such as Stendhal, Jules Michelet and Victor Hugo, and the parents of Maurice Denis who was born "accidentally" in Granville.

The town continued to equip itself with the opening in 1884 of the municipal library, in 1886 the school group of St. Paul, in 1887 the dry dock and in 1897 a corps of firefighters. To entertain holidaymakers, the Granvillaises Regatta Society was founded in 1889, the horse racing course and the Société des Courses of Granville in 1890, and the golf course in 1912. The Montparnasse derailment was on 22 October 1895, when the Granville–Paris express train overran the buffers at Paris Montparnasse station. Finally, in 1898, the St. Paul Church was inaugurated.

The 20th century began with the burning of the Château de la Crête in 1900. In 1905, fashion designer Christian Dior was born in Granville; his childhood home is now a museum. In 1908, the town was endowed with a visitor centre. It also became a centre of communication with the opening in 1908 of the railway line and tramway of Granville to Sourdeval, passing through Avranches, and one towards Condé-sur-Vire in 1910. In 1911, the new casino was opened, with the maternity hospital and the savings bank by minister Jules Pams.

After the war, the regatta resumed in 1919, the carnival in 1920 and a son of the area, became Minister of Commerce in the seventh government of Aristide Briand and came to visit the town in 1921. In 1925, a new railway station was inaugurated, Granville became a health resort and the Hôtel des Bains opened in 1926. In 1931, the last fishing vessel returned from Newfoundland.

World War II

A garrison and coastal town closing the Bay of Mont Saint-Michel, Granville has always been coveted during armed conflicts in the area. During the Second World War, on 17 June 1940, the Germans entered Granville. On 21 September 1941, an article appeared in Le Granvillais signed by the name of "Camille", where the author was alerting readers to the dangers and lack of basis for the next laws on the status of Jews of the Vichy regime. Despite this mark of resistance, eight Granville Jews were deported to Auschwitz: Léon Bobulesco and his two sons Armand and Rodolphe, Simon Goldenberg, his wife Minka and their children Henri and Ruben, as well as Smil Weesler. Three Communists suffered the same fate: Léon Lamort, René Loncle and Charles Passot.

The whole of the population underwent the constraints of the Occupation. From the beginning, the Germans built fortifications on the Pointe du Roc and forbade access to the port. On 20 May 1942, a new municipal council was installed by the prefect. on 1 April 1943, all of the Haute-Ville had to be evacuated, barriers and anti-tank roadblocks prevented access. The Normandy Hotel was transformed into a kommandantur and a branch of the Gestapo.

A signature name of this period was Maurice Marland. Born on 12 February 1888 in Falaise, and a teacher of English, French and civics, he led a resistance network. Notable in the town, in 1939, he organised the reception of Belgian refugees and the evacuation of British soldiers. Later, with Jules Leprince, they put escape routes to Jersey in place. Throughout the occupation, his relations enabled him to mount a clandestine intelligence network on port and rail facilities and enemy operations in the Channel Islands. Arrested and then released in 1941 and 1943, he nonetheless continued until 22 July 1944, when he was arrested and shot in the forest of Lucerne at the request of collaborators. On 23 July 1994, his son Serge Marland filed a complaint for crimes against humanity, the investigation concluded that he was assassinated by German soldiers. Today, the secondary school of the commune bears his name.

Liberated without fighting on 31 July 1944, it saw the troops of General Patton pass for two days, who went down to the town centre by the Coutances road and up the Rue Couraye to get out by the Avranches road. The vibration caused by the passage of armoured cars for two days brought down the façade nameplates of several houses.

Granville was reoccupied for a few hours, during the Granville Raid of 9 March 1945, by German soldiers who had landed from Jersey. Although spotted by the radar of Coutainville, the Germans aboard light boats managed to land at night in the port of Granville. They dynamited port facilities and sank four freighters. Fifteen U.S., eight British and six French soldiers were killed, seventy German prisoners were released and five Americans and four British were captured before the German commando unit took flight.

Contemporary history
During the Algerian War, the barracks housed the 3rd Demi-brigade, and then the 21st Battalion of chasseurs on foot, from 1956 to 1961. It was a training centre for thousands of contingent recruits before leaving for Kabylie or the region of Tiaret. The commune hosted the finish of stage 1 and the start of stage 2 of the 1957 Tour de France.

In 1962, the town of Granville absorbed the commune of Saint-Nicolas-près-Granville; the latter, during the revolutionary period of the National Convention (1792–1795), bore the name Champ-Libre [Free Field]. On 4 June 1965, Granville welcomed Prime Minister Georges Pompidou.

In 1970, the Regional Nautical Centre moved to Granville and in 1975, the port was completed with a marina. In 1973,  opened a factory for the production of biscottes, in business ever since.

In the 1980s, donations by Richard Anacréon allowed the opening of the Museum of modern art, many buildings in the town were classified or registered as historical monuments. In 1982, the town was endowed of a new hospital. In 1984, the military regiments left the barracks, allowing redevelopment of the Pointe du Roc.

In 1991, the  opened and the Charter of the Douzelage was signed.

At the turn of the millennium, the business incubator emerged. In 2003, the A84 autoroute joined Granville with other agglomerations.

Demography

Demographic evolution
In 2017, the commune had 12,580 inhabitants.

Of 6,649 people at the beginning of the census of the people in 1793, the commune reached a demographic peak in 1861 with 17,180 inhabitants, prior to be severely affected by the War of 1870 by losing nearly 1,000 of its children. Then began a slow decline accentuated by the World War I, no longer accommodating more than 10,132 inhabitants in 1946. The second half of the 20th century – with the absorption of Saint-Nicolas-près-Granville in 1962, the rural exodus and the construction of many estates on the outskirts – allowed the commune to gain residents again to achieve 13,022 inhabitants in 2006. That same year, only 0.5% of the Granville population was foreign, with the presence small Portuguese, Spanish and Moroccan communities each representing 0.1% of the population, far from the regional average of 8.8%, and 16.9% of households consisted of single-parent families, ten points under this same regional average.

Age structure
As reflected in the age structure, Granville is an exemplary commune in terms of the age distribution of its inhabitants, each category representing around 15 to 20% of the population. Only the centenarians are poorly represented, as on the whole of the territory. However, a lower rate of children under 15 years in 2006 reflected an ageing of Granville families and a possible future demographic deficit. That same year, only 25.9% of the population was less than 25 years old.

Politics and administration

Local politics
Granville is the chef-lieu of the canton represented by the centre-right  Jean-Marc Julienne. The commune is linked to Manche's 2nd constituency represented by deputy Guénhaël Huet (UMP).

Thirty-three elected officials sit on the municipal council, divided into twenty-four members of the municipal majority from a list of independents, a group of five councillors of a UDI list, three elected leftists including former PRG mayor Daniel Caruhel and an elected frontist. The board is chaired by a woman, Dominique Baudry, assisted by nine adjoints.

Two  have settled in the town, an HLM management company manages 1563 homes in the town, a  provides aid to people in need.

It also directs the SMBCG (Joint Association of Granville coastal areas) for the protection of coastal waters against microbiological risk.

List of mayors
Sixty-eight mayors have headed the municipal administration of Granville, since the election of the first mayor in 1692.

Political trends and results

In the context of the elections, the population of Granville shows a relatively conservative tendency and votes as regularly as the entire national population, thus following the "vague rose" [pink wave] in the regional elections of 2004, but instead voting by a large majority for the European Constitutional Treaty. An opposition group published a journal, Le Sans-culotte de Granville and Coutances. District committees are located in the commune to enliven the local debate. In 2008, the list led by the outgoing general counsel of the Miscellaneous left, Daniel Caruhel, ex-socialist but supported by outgoing UMP mayor, Marc Verdier, and housing nine members of the Miscellaneous right outgoing majority, won the municipal election against the official candidate of the Socialist Party. The canton returned to Jean-Marc Julienne, assistant Marc Verdier and running mate Daniel Caruhel, belonging to the New Centre but elected as independent. Thus, contrary to what the labels might suggest, Granville voters had once again made the choice of conservatism.

Presidential elections, results of the second round

 Presidential election, 2002: 86.65% for Jacques Chirac (RPR), 13.35% for Jean-Marie Le Pen (FN), 75.32% turnout.
 Presidential election, 2007: 52.42% for Nicolas Sarkozy (UMP), 47.58% for Ségolène Royal (PS), 82.27% turnout.
 Presidential election, 2012: 52.22% for François Hollande (PS), 47.78% for Nicolas Sarkozy (UMP), 78.97% turnout.

Parliamentary elections, results of the second round

 Parliamentary election, 2002: 54.24% for Alain Cousin (UMP), 45.76% for Daniele Jordan-Menninger (PS), 55.17% turnout.
 Parliamentary election, 2007: 54.48% for Alain Cousin (UMP), 45.52% for Daniele Jordan-Menninger (PS), 55.09% turnout.
 Parliamentary election, 2012: 50.19% for Guénhaël Huet (UMP), 49.81% for Gérard Saure (PRG), 55.29% turnout.

European elections, results from the two best scores

 European Parliament election, 2004: 31.92% for Henri Weber (PS), 19.08% for Tokia Saïfi (UMP), 43.76% turnout.
 European Parliament election, 2009: 31.12% for Dominique Riquet (UMP), 17.72% for Hélène Flautre (Europe Ecology), 41.13% turnout.

Regional elections, results from the two best scores

 Regional election, 2004: 50.42% for Philippe Duron (PS), 38.27% for René Garrec (UMP), 60.39% turnout.
 Regional election, 2010: 56.31% for Laurent Beauvais (PS), 43.69% for Jean-François Le Grand (UMP), 50.70% turnout.

Cantonal elections, results of the second round

 Cantonal elections, 2001: missing data.
 Cantonal elections, 2008: 53.63% for Jean-Marc Julienne (NC), 25.64 to François Heurguier (PS), 61.92% turnout.

Municipal elections, results of the second round

 Municipal elections, 2001: 51.53% for Marc Verdier (RPR) elected in the first round, 48.47% for Jean Leguelinel (PS), 53.98% turnout.
 Municipal elections, 2008: 49.48% for Daniel care (DVG), 28.59% for André June (DVG), 62.46% turnout.

Referendum elections

 Referendum of 2000 relating to the five-year presidential term: 73.39% for Yes, 26.61% for No, 31.83% turnout.
 Referendum of 2005 on the Treaty establishing a Constitution for Europe: 51.42% for Yes, 48.58% for No, 66.22% turnout.

Education
Four public kindergartens and  welcome pupils of the commune: The Group of Docteur-Lanos, the Jean Macé Group, the Jules Ferry Group, and the Pierre and Marie Curie Group.

The town has two high schools: Lycée Léon Julliot de la Morandière for general, technological and  education, and the Maurice-Marland hotelier's school.

Finally, the commune has a leisure centre for the reception of children out of school periods, a family crèche and a multi-host centre for young children.

Health

The centre is also equipped with a scanner. In 2007, a ministerial decision endorsed the closure of the maternity of the communal hospital carrying 410 deliveries per year.

The commune also hosts on its territory a centre of re-education and rehabilitation, a centre of thalassotherapy, three Residential homes for elderly dependents, two health centres, 91 doctors, eight dentists and seven pharmacists.

Several medical or social associations are located on the commune, such as the Union of the Speech Therapists of Manche, the SNSM, the Rotary Club, the Red Cross and the Secours Populaire.

Public services
The civil security has a base for monitoring the English Channel equipped with a Eurocopter EC145.

Twin towns – Sister cities

Granville is a founding member of the Douzelage, a unique town twinning association of 24 towns across the European Union. This active town twinning began in 1991 and there are regular events, such as a produce market from each of the other countries and festivals. Henry Haffray, initiator and founder of the douzelage was the first president of the Granville partenaire européen [Granville European partner] association, he was followed for more than a dozen years by Jean-Marc Julienne, then André Gendre and Pascale Vallée.

Members of the Douzelage

  Altea, Spain – 1991
  Bad Kötzting, Germany – 1991
  Bellagio, Italy – 1991
  Bundoran, Ireland – 1991
  Holstebro, Denmark – 1991
  Houffalize, Belgium – 1991
  Meerssen, the Netherlands – 1991
  Niederanven, Luxembourg – 1991
  Preveza, Greece – 1991
  Sesimbra, Portugal – 1991
  Sherborne, United Kingdom – 1991
  Karkkila, Finland – 1997
  Oxelösund, Sweden – 1998
  Judenburg, Austria – 1999
  Chojna, Poland – 2004
  Kőszeg, Hungary – 2004
  Sigulda, Latvia – 2004
  Sušice, Czech Republic – 2004
  Türi, Estonia – 2004
  Zvolen, Slovakia – 2007
  Prienai, Lithuania – 2008
  Marsaskala, Malta – 2009
  Siret, Romania – 2010
  Agros, Cyprus – 2011
  Škofja Loka, Slovenia – 2011
  Tryavna, Bulgaria – 2011

Daily life in Granville

Culture
It also hosts an aquarium located on the Pointe du Roc which shows many species of warm-water marine fish and three exhibition spaces: The  Féerie des Coquillages [Enchantment of the Shells], the Palais Minéral [Mineral Palace] and the Jardin des Papillons [Butterfly Garden].

For cultural recreation, the Charles de la Morandière media library, in the town centre, the Room of the Archipelago, a multipurpose room of 600 seats and a 400-seat open-air theatre has been open since 2006, the small Theatre of the Peninsula with a capacity of 65 seats, the newly renovated Le Select cinema offers three rooms, a music school and a  animate the life of the commune.

Sixty-four  relay and encourage communal cultural life.

Sport

A municipal sports school and a municipal swimming school provide training for members. Sixty-two associations ensure the relay of communal services.

In road cycling, Granville was a stage town of the 1957 Tour de France, and the  ends each year at Granville. The commune hosted the start of the third stage of the 2016 Tour de France.

In sailing, Granville is a stage town each year of the Tour de France à la voile. In August are organized: A swimming tour of the Roc, the Chausey regatta, the Course des  where La Granvillaise and La Cancalaise confront each other, the raid of catamaran in the Bay of Mont Saint-Michel.

Granville has also developed its first men's handball team in National 3.

Religion
They depend on the parish of St. Clement of the Deanery of the Lands of Granville-Villedieu in the Diocese of Coutances and Avranches. The bishop of this diocese is Stanislas Lalanne.

Granville has hosted several congregations, which those of the Sacred Heart and Mercy. Also, between 1839 and 2008, the Sisters Hospitaller of Saint-Thomas-de-Villeneuve were responsible for the hospice of Granville and for the St. Nicolas Care Centre from 1976. The upper town still houses Carmelites.

A Protestant temple of the Reformed Church of France and another of the Evangelical Church welcome the faithful.

Media
The weekly  and the newspaper Ouest-France have premises in the commune and distribute a specific local edition in the Granville area. Granville is located in the transmission area of the television channel France 3 Normandie. A local correspondent of the Gazette de l'Avranchin and of the Mortainais officiates in the commune.

Economy
It manages the port and airport  of the commune. It has set up a business incubator and has three areas of activity or industrial areas: Le Mesnil, La Parfonterie and Le Prétôt. The largest employers in the commune are the centre of thalassotherapy Le Normandy, the Compagnie Générale des Eaux and the biscotte factory of LU- opened in 1973. In 2017, the unemployment rate was 11.5% for a rated active population of 4,514 people. 44.5% of the main residences were inhabited by their owners (2017), and the commune hosts 1,617 companies (2015). Granville was a garrison town with the presence of a contingent of the 1st RIMa until 1984. A market is held every Saturday on the Cours Jonville.

Port of Granville

The port of Granville dates back to the 16th century.

This part of the Channel is known for its many rocks off the coast, not always visible above sea level, and for the dangerous flows caused by tides. The bay of Mont Saint-Michel experiences one of the greatest tidal ranges in the world, and this causes strong currents that generate dangerous flows into the international sea routes, adding to the normal tidal flow that goes along the Channel. The area also often experiences fog as well as easterly winds which can create dangerous storms during autumn and winter.

The waters off Granville are regularly affected by pollution caused by modern shipwrecks, or by illegal fuel tank discharges into the sea. There is now an international agreement between France and the UK, as well as other European countries bordering the Channel, to severely punish ship-owners when such pollution can be proven. The area is constantly under surveillance by aircraft and radar operated by civil and military authorities. Granville harbour hosts a small maritime emergency rescue team.

The number of rocks and shipwrecks in the area creates an environment rich in seafood, which can be exploited from the small harbour of Granville. Fishing is dangerous in the area, and many small fishing boats have been involved in collisions with large commercial vessels such as container ships and oil supertankers.

In 2005, Granville was placed at 32nd in the national rank with 197,000 tonnes of handled cargo and 44,100 passengers. It is also a permanent station of the SNSM which has a lifeboat (registered SNS 074) and two RIBs.

A cod fishing and oyster port in the 19th century, it became:

 There are some sea services to England and to the Channel Islands. This traffic is relatively light from Granville, as Saint-Malo and Cherbourg offer more industrialised facilities for passenger and cargo traffic. A port for the carriage of passengers with the ferries Douce France, Jolie France II and Joly France I destined for the Chausey and Channel Islands. Although there are no regular passenger sea services between Granville and Chausey. French and British security forces operate permanently in this very dangerous and narrow area of the Channel, which is one of the busiest sealanes in the world.
The maximum permissible draught in Granville harbour is 11.60 with a tidal coefficient of 100.
 The first Norman fishing port of shellfish (clams, whelks, dog cockles, Saint-Jacques scallops), crustaceans (lobsters, brown crabs, small crabs, spider crabs) and fish (bream, rays, sharks, soles, pollock, bass, red mullet, cod, cuttlefish and squid) for local consumption with a fish market, a refrigerating terminal and a computerised sale of products. The tonnage landed (excluding farming) is of the order of 16,000 tonnes per year. An average of seventy-five equipped vessels with nearly 450 professional sailors attend the port. The marine cultures present on the islands of Chausey produce nearly 250 tons of clams, 5,000 tonnes of mussels and 100 tons of oysters.
 A marina, since 1975, of a thousand docking rings at the Hérel Basin. It hosts 3,500 vessels per year, with an average of three passengers per boat. They represent €787,000 of direct benefits, in addition to an annual turnover of €25 million for the 40 companies which work from the marina. Located a few minutes walk from the town centre, the Hérel Marina is one of the local economic lungs.

A port redevelopment and expansion project will provide an additional seven hundred places for recreational boating, the excavation of basins and access channels to extend access times and beaching capacity, the addition of a quayside for cruise ships and of exception, a new port city link, with the study of a railway extension project a redevelopment of the road routes, respecting and valuing the environmental and architectural heritage including the piers of the 18th and 19th centuries.

Granville-Mont-Saint-Michel Airport

The airport of Granville-Mont-Saint-Michel specialises in tourist and leisure aviation.

Tourism
The commune has been classified as a climate resort since 16 March 1926, and a tourist and seaside resort since 12 March 1979. Tourism is an important part of the local economy. The commune has a tourist office which ensures the promotion of monuments, museums and natural sites, and has joined the association of the Most Beautiful Detours of France. It offers much infrastructure, including some certified by the  label issued by the French Ministry for the Economy and Finance: Two three-star hotels, six two-star hotels and seven hotels not classified with a total of 213 rooms, two three-star campsites with a total of 145 pitches, communal gites on the Chausey Islands and guest rooms, a youth hostel, a thalassotherapy centre, thirty-three restaurants with a total of 1,931 seats.

For entertainment, the city offers an independent casino, four museums, an aquarium, a rich architectural and environmental heritage, four beaches, and four Wi-Fi access points. 17.5% of Granville housing are second homes, with 54.1% of apartments.

Local culture and heritage

Environmental heritage
From north to south through the peninsula, the city is crossed by the hiking trail GR 223 which traverses Normandy from Honfleur to Avranches along the coast.

The town was awarded three flowers in the Competition of flowery cities and villages thanks to its parks and gardens: The Christian Dior Garden, the Val-ès-Fleur Park of  complete with a zoo, the squares of Marland, the Arsenal, Chartier, Bisquine, the Charles VII promenades, those of the harbour and of the Plat Gousset. The landscaped golf course, on the territory of Bréville-sur-Mer, was designed by Harry Colt in 1912 and provides 27 holes of links golf.

The Chausey islands were proposed for integration into the Natura 2000 network in 1992, but the Council of the  gave an unfavourable opinion in 2003, blocking the procedure to date. However, the Conservatoire du littoral has acquired the Pointe du Phare.

In addition, the town has on its territory a sewage treatment plant and a waste processing plant for incineration and recycling. It has also set up waste sorting and heads the Joint Association of Granville Coastal Areas for coastal protection against microbiological hazards.

Architectural heritage

It was built by the English during the Hundred Years' War. The choir is of 1641, the nave of 1655, the apse chapels in 1676 and 1688, and the sacristy is of 1771, a listed historical monument since 1930, it is decorated with stained glass by Jacques Le Chevallier. As well as a thirteenth-century miraculous statue of Mary, visitors should note, on the eighteenth-century façade, the quatrain:

("If love of Mary is engraved on your heart, when passing do not forget to say Hail to her.") The same verses are to be seen on the façade of Notre-Dame de Bon-Secours in Montréal. There is also St. Paul's Church, the St. Nicholas Church and the Protestant temple.

The lower town was partly built on land reclaimed from the sea. Granville's military past remains, the upper part of the old town is surrounded with the  consisting of the ramparts from the fifteenth century, the drawbridge (Grande'Porte), the bloody theatre of the "Siège des Vendéens" in 1793, built in the 15th century, destroyed and then raised in 1727, and listed as an historical monument since 2004. Inside the walls of the upper town are some beautiful houses of which several are concentrated on Rue Saint-Jean. On the Pointe du Roc overlooking the town, the Bazeilles barracks built in 1758, the Gênes-Champagne barracks built in 1788 and the battery built in 1942 by the German occupiers have been listed monuments since 1987 and 1994.

The , built in the 15th century, registered as an historic monument since 1980, the Château de la Crête, and Saint-Nicolas' Manor, built in 1786 by the shipowner Nicolas Deslandes, have been registered monuments since 1986 and bear witness to the importance of certain families in the region.

The statue of Pléville le Peley at the port celebrates the most illustrious character of the city.

The covered market was labeled 'Heritage of the 20th century' by the DRAC. The residential tower "Le Charme" [The Charm] located on Rue Jean Rostand dominates the commune with its thirteen floors.

There is a museum located in one of the gates which preserves invaluable documents enabling visitors to discover the history of the town through the centuries.

Granville also is the home of the Christian Dior Museum, which is located in the fashion designer's childhood home, Villa Les Rhumbs.

After a first bid at the beginning of the 1990s, Granville postulated in 2009 to be labelled Town of Art and History. Declared 1 July 2015, in the sub-prefecture of Avranches, the association law 1901 "Granville, country of the foreshore" which comprises the communes of Granville and Saint-Pair-sur-Mer, Jullouville and Carolles, is now the candidacy "Lands of Art and History" label.

Festivities
The festive year of Granville revolves around various events. The  takes place every year during the week before Mardi gras. It once celebrated the departure of the sailors who took advantage of the holiday before sailing for Newfoundland. In 2007, for its 134th edition, it hosted more than 130,000 spectators. The feast of the patron saint of the commune is organised at Pentecost. Each year, the third week of July is dedicated to the Rue Sorties de Bains festival, of which the fifth edition took place in 2007. Outdoor concerts are held during the tourist season. The procession of the Grand Pardon des Corporations et de la Mer [Atonement of the Corporations and the Sea] is traditionally held the last Sunday of July. The Night of Welders, a festival gathering metalworking artists, takes place during the first weekend of August. The same weekend the Journée du Livre [Day of the Book] is organised, during which writers dedicate their works.

Two fairs are held on the second Saturday in April and the third Saturday of September, a flea market is organised during the weekend of 14 July and an antique fair during the weekend before 15 August. A collectors fair is scheduled for the last Sunday in October. In 2005, the commune celebrated the centenary of the birth of Christian Dior by organising, across the town, exhibitions and retrospectives on the work and life of the couturier. The Christian Dior Museum sometimes serves as a framework for events, as was the case in 2008 for the exhibition entitled "Dandysmes - 1808–2008, of Barbey d'Aurevilly at Christian Dior".

Personalities linked to the commune
Several public figures were born, died or lived in Granville:

Born in Granville

 Louis-Georges de Bréquigny (1714–1795), historian and paleographer.
 Georges René Le Peley de Pléville (1726–1805), vice admiral, Minister of Marine and Colonies
  (1747–1816), mayor of Granville, member of the Council of Elders and the Tribunate
 Étienne-François Letourneur (1751–1817), Director of the First French Republic
  (1767–1837), frigate captain during the Revolution and the Empire, he commanded the seventy-four L'Argonaute at the Battle of Trafalgar
  (1768–1841), captain of La Piémontaise, was born and died in Granville
 Pierre Dumanoir le Pelley (1770–1829), vice admiral, he unsuccessfully commanded the vanguard of the line of Franco-Spanish vessels at Trafalgar; politician and Commander of the Legion of Honour
  (1780–1858), royal courier
  (1787–1851), winner of the naval battle of Arromanches in 1811
  (1787–1847), rear admiral
 Michel Pierre Alexis Hébert (1799–1887), lawyer and politician
  (1807–1873), novelist, poet, politician, journalist and historian
 Louis Henri de Gueydon (1809–1886), vice admiral, governor of Algeria
 Fortuné du Boisgobey (1821–1891), writer.
  (1824–1898), painter
 , (1841–1913), Auxiliary Bishop of Rouen
  (1841–1880), landscape painter and on porcelain
  (1853–1907), professor of anatomy at the 
 Émile Guépratte known as "point d'honneur" [point of honour], (1856–1939), admiral, Grand Croix of the Legion of Honour
  (1867–1932), politician and industrialist
 Maurice Denis (1870–1943), painter, engraver, theorist and historian of French art
 Léon Carré (1878–1942), Orientalist painter, winner of the Abd-el-Tif prize in 1909
 Léon Julliot de La Morandière, (1885–1968), Professor and Dean of the Paris Law Faculty, then at the University Paris II Panthéon-Assas, also director of the Comparative Law Institute in Paris
  (1901–1999), actress

 Christian Dior (1905–1957), legendary couturier
 Denise Cocquerillat (1918-1999), archaeologist and Assyriologist, specialist in cuneiform texts
  (born 1932), journalist
 Pierre Pican (1935-2018), Bishop of Bayeux and Lisieux
  (born 1939), writer
  (born 1939), navigator
 Angèle Delaunois (born 1946), writer
 Bernard Chenez (born 1946), cartoonist
 Michel Santier (born 1947), Bishop of Luçon and of Créteil
 Jacky Robert (born 1950), chef
  (born 1955), politician
 Jacques Gamblin (born 1957), actor
 Christophe Auguin (born 1959), sailor, winner of the 1996–97 Vendée Globe yacht race
 Lucile Rogations (born 1984), writer who published her first book at twelve, winner of the Flammarion Youth Prize

Died in Granville
  (1791–1870), artist and songwriter
  (1878–1951), painter, died and is buried in Granville
 Jean Tissier (1896–1973), actor
 Eric Crozier (1914–1994), librettist and theatrical director
 Guy Degrenne (1925–2006), businessman

Others
 Georges Bonheur, investor who was significant to the development of Granville as a seaside resort at the beginning of the 20th century. About the impact of his life and how it is still relevant in Granville today.
 Richard I de Grenville (died after 1142), Anglo-Norman knight
 Thomas de Scales (c. 1400–1460), Knight of the Garter, founded the citadel
 John Granville (1628–1701), 1st Earl of Bath, soldier of the English Civil War, lived in Granville
 George Granville (1666–1735), 1st Baron Lansdowne, English poet, playwright and politician, lived in Granville
 Robert Carteret, 3rd Earl Granville (1721–1776), 3rd Earl Granville, lived in Granville
 Louis Jacob (1768–1854), politician and admiral, lived in Granville
 Honoré de Balzac (1799–1850), writer, stayed there in 1829. He evoked the headquarters in Granville in Le Réquisitionnaire in 1831
  (1837–1927), shipowner, politician, mayor of Granville from 1882 to 1888, lived in Granville
  (1859–1934), writer and poet, lived in Granville
 Maurice Orange (1867–1916), painter, lived in Granville
  (1883–1945), poet, stayed in Granville during his youth
 Maurice Marland (1888–1944), chief of the Resistance of Granville during World War II, a professor in the same town
  (1901–1987), writer and painter, lived at Chausey
  (1914–2009), first president of the Court of Auditors in 1978–1982, was mayor
 Bertrand Poirot-Delpech (1929–2006), journalist, writer and academician, lived at Chausey

Stendhal, Jules Michelet, Victor Hugo, Adolphe Willette and Gustave Goublier also all stayed in Granville.

Heraldry

The coat of arms of Granville has changed several times during its history. The first, granted by Charles VIII in 1487 was thus:

 Azure a dextrochère Or, issuant from a cloud of the same, which holds a sword argent mounted Or and placed between three stars of the same.

The sword symbolising the patriotism of the city during the English occupation, the stars appearing on the night of 8 November 1442 when  took over the city.

The second coat of arms was established in 1697:

 Azure with dextrochère armed Or issuant from a cloud of the same and holding a sword argent, the guard and handle Or, surmounted by a Sun of the same.

The Sun replaced the stars, this new coat of arms symbolised the importance of Granville in the monitoring of the coast of the Bay.

In 1793, the influence of the Revolution changed the azure to gules, but the arm is no longer armed and the sword became an honorary, which gives:

 Gules an arm stretched argent emerging from a cloud azure, holding a sword argent of a guard Or in pale.

In 1811, the First Empire offered new arms to the town, Napoleon adding distinctive towns of second-order signs, a quarter charged with a capital N and a gold star and the exterior ornament of a mural crown:

 Azure on a cloudy fess argent, together with three stars Or, two in chief and one in point, dextrochère armed, sable, moving from sinister side of the shield and holding a sword high Or, quarter and trappings of the towns of second order.

Finally, in 1816 under the Restoration, the town returned to its coat of arms from 1697, unable to pay the registration fee to return to the original coat of arms. This coat of arms is now of the commune, the azure and Sun symbolising its seaside character, the sword recalling its military past of garrison town.

The Granville arms appear on the locomotives nos. X4791 and 8719C of the SNCF under the sponsorship of the commune.

The commune also has a logo.

The commune also has a flag representing a quarterly of blue and white, with a white cross encircled in blue and charged with a representation of the coat of arms in the centre. It is notably used on the commune's yawls.

Gastronomy
Granville is renowned for its marine products, including Granvillaise galette with scallops sprinkled with cream, sea bream in salt crust with virgin sauce (mussels, shrimps, sea snails and whelks), and the Granvillaise sole accompanied with mussels and prawns. A speciality of the island quarter of Chausey is also linked: The . On Saturday, a market is held in the town centre to purchase local produce.

Granville dialect
Beyond the Norman dialect, there a dialect of the Granville area with its expressions. An example expression is "achitrer" which means "to land a punch".

Granville in the arts and culture
Granville is the subject of several paintings including Bateaux à Granville [Boats at Granville] painted in 1889 by Maurice Denis, Les brisants à la pointe de Granville [The breakers at the tip of Granville] painted around 1852 by Paul Huet and kept in the Louvre, Plage de Granville [Beach of Granville] painted in 1863 by Eugène Isabey.

Myths and legends
 The Chausey Islands are part of the ancient , a former place of pagan worship, which covered the bay and which reportedly disappeared in 709AD under the waves.
 According to a popular belief, the Chausey Islands consist of 52 islands at high tide and 365 at low tide, as the number of weeks and days in a year, respectively.

Gallery

See also
 Communes of the Manche department
 Douzelage
 Gare de Granville
 Granville (disambiguation)

Notes

References

Bibliography

External links

 Granville town council website 
 Remnants from world war II in Granville
 Georges Vérez. sculptor of Granville War Memorial.

Communes of Manche
Ports and harbours of the English Channel
Populated places established in the 12th century
Seaside resorts in France